Bahurani is a 1963 Indian Hindi-language drama film directed by T. Prakash Rao. The film stars Guru Dutt, Mala Sinha and Feroz Khan in pivotal roles.

It is a remake of the Telugu movie Ardhangi, which was based on Maddipatla Suri's Telugu translation of the Bengali novel Swayamsiddha, written by Manilal Banerjee. Swayamsiddha went on to be made into a 1975 Bengali movie of same name. Ardhangi was remade in Tamil as Pennin Perumai and was also remade again in Hindi as Jyoti in 1981.

Plot
Zamindar (Nazir Hussain) has two sons — Raghu, by his first wife and Vikram, by his second wife. Raghu (Guru Dutt) is a simple-minded and innocent young man. Vikram (Feroz Khan) is cruel, domineering, selfish and greedy and he maltreats everyone, from servants to his own brother Raghu. Vikram's vicious mother Rajeshwari (Lalita Pawar) does the same.

After Vikram has a feud with a tough and smart village girl named Padma (Mala Sinha), who is the first person to ever confront him, Zamindar gets the idea of marrying Vikram and Padma. Vikram refuses and after a series of incidents, Padma marries Raghu instead. When she understands how her husband has been treated over the years, she vows to set things right and in the process falls in love with him. Inspired by her love, fearlessness and no-nonsense attitude, Raghu begins to find the courage to resist his oppressors.

Cast
Guru Dutt as Raghu
Mala Sinha as Padma
Feroz Khan as Vikram 
Nazir Hussain as Zamindar
Lalita Pawar as Rajeshwari 
Mukri as Sukhiya
Shivraj as Diwan
Agha as Banwarilal
Badri Prasad as Vaid
Shyama as Chanda Bai
Manorama as Chanda's mother
Pratima Devi as Dai Maa
Nazir Kashmiri as  Kalicharan

Awards
Nominated, Filmfare Best Actress Award - Mala Sinha

Music
The songs of the film was composed by C. Ramchandra with lyrics authored by Sahir Ludhianvi.

Other versions
The story line has been inspiration for various movies and has had various remakes in Indian film industry.

References

External links

1963 films
Indian drama films
Hindi remakes of Telugu films
1960s Hindi-language films
Films scored by C. Ramchandra
Films directed by T. Prakash Rao
1963 drama films
Hindi-language drama films